The Enchanted Island is a pasticcio (pastiche) of music by various baroque composers, including George Frideric Handel, Antonio Vivaldi, and Jean-Philippe Rameau, devised and written by Jeremy Sams after The Tempest and A Midsummer Night's Dream by William Shakespeare. It was created by Julian Crouch and Phelim McDermott and premiered by the Metropolitan Opera on December 31, 2011, starring David Daniels, Joyce DiDonato, Danielle de Niese, Luca Pisaroni, and Lisette Oropesa. The popular 70-year-old Spanish tenor, Plácido Domingo, played the small but important part of the sea god Neptune. The following month a performance of the pasticcio was broadcast live into movie theaters across the world as part of the Metropolitan Opera Live in HD series. In late 2012, Virgin Classics released this broadcast version on DVD. The Met revived The Enchanted Island two seasons later. Daniels, de Niese, Pisaroni, and Domingo revived their roles from the premiere. Susan Graham assumed the role of Sycorax from DiDonato.

Roles

Musical numbers
The music has been drawn from the following sources:

Recording

References

External links
Metropolitan Opera 
The Enchanted Island
The music of The Enchanted Island
The libretto of The Enchanted Island

Operas
2011 operas
Operas by multiple composers
English-language operas
Opera world premieres at the Metropolitan Opera
Operas by George Frideric Handel
Operas by Antonio Vivaldi
Operas by Jean-Philippe Rameau
Operas based on The Tempest
Operas based on A Midsummer Night's Dream